The rivière aux Canots is a tributary of the east bank of the Métabetchouane River, flowing in the unorganized territory of Belle-Rivière, in the Lac-Saint-Jean-Est Regional County Municipality, in the administrative region of Saguenay–Lac-Saint-Jean, in the province of Quebec, in Canada. The upper part of this river crosses the Laurentides Wildlife Reserve.

The surface of the Rivière aux Canots (except the rapids areas) is usually frozen from the end of November to the beginning of April, however the safe circulation on the ice is generally done from mid-December to the end of March.

Geography 
The main watersheds neighboring the Rivière aux Canots are:
 north side: Métabetchouane River, rivière à la Carpe (Métabetchouane River), La Belle Rivière (Lac Saint-Jean), Saguenay River;
 east side: Gendreau stream, Pika River, rivière aux Écorces;
 south side: Huard lake, Métabetchouane River;
 west side: Métabetchouane River, Bruyante River, Fouet River.

The Rivière aux Canots rises at the mouth of Lake Staffieri in the shape of a U due to almost island attached to the north shore and stretching  to the south.

  to the north by forming three hooks to the east, up to Gendreau stream (coming from the east);
  north-west, up to the outlet (coming from the south) of "Lac des Massettes";
  north-west, then west, winding, then west, until the outlet (coming from the south) of lakes Hogue, Glun, Castagnet and Gingras ;
  towards the north by snaking to the outlet (coming from the north) of "Lac Sous-le-Vent";
  towards the northwest by first forming a hook towards the south, up to the outlet (coming from the south) of Morainique lake;
  towards the northwest by winding at the end of the segment, to its mouth, located on the east bank of the Métabetchouane River.

Toponymy 
The toponym "Rivière aux Canots" is associated with the use of this watercraft and body of water

The toponym “Rivière aux Canots” was formalized on December 5, 1968, at the Place Names Bank of the Commission de toponymie du Québec.

See also 

 St. Lawrence River
 List of rivers of Quebec

References

External links 
 Official site of the Réserve faunique des Laurentides

Rivers of Saguenay–Lac-Saint-Jean
Lac-Saint-Jean-Est Regional County Municipality
Laurentides Wildlife Reserve